The Battle of Shire (Italian: Battaglia dello Shirè) was a battle fought on the northern front of what was known as the Second Italo-Abyssinian War.  This battle consisted of attacks and counterattacks by Italian forces under Marshal of Italy Pietro Badoglio and Ethiopian forces under Ras Imru Haile Selassie.  This battle was primarily fought in the Shire area of Ethiopia.

Background

On 3 October 1935, General Emilio De Bono advanced into Ethiopia from Eritrea without a declaration of war. De Bono had a force of approximately 100,000 Italian soldiers and 25,000 Eritrean soldiers to advance towards Addis Ababa.  In December, after a brief period of inactivity and minor setbacks for the Italians, De Bono was replaced by Badoglio.

Emperor Haile Selassie I launched the Christmas Offensive late in the year to test Badoglio.  For a brief period of time, the initiative switched to the Ethiopians.

Preparation

In early January 1936, the Ethiopian forces were in the hills everywhere overlooking the Italian positions and launching attacks against them on a regular basis.  Italian dictator Benito Mussolini was impatient for an Italian offensive to get under way and for the Ethiopians to be swept from the field.  In response to his frequent exhortations, Badoglio cabled Mussolini:  "It has always been my rule to be meticulous in preparation so that I may be swift in action."  By mid-January 1936, Badoglio was ready to renew the advance on the Ethiopian capital.  Badoglio overwhelmed the armies of ill-armed and uncoordinated Ethiopian warriors with mustard gas, tanks, and heavy artillery.

The Ethiopians facing the Italians were in three groupings.  In the center, near Abiy Addi and along the Beles River in the Tembien, were Ras Kassa Haile Darge with approximately 40,000 men and Ras Seyum Mangasha with about 30,000 men.  On the Ethiopian right was Ras Mulugeta Yeggazu and his army of approximately 80,000 men in positions atop Amba Aradam.  Ras Imru Haile Selassie with approximately 40,000 men was on the Ethiopian left in the area around Seleh Leha and Shire.

Badoglio had five army corps at his disposal.  On his right, he had the Italian IV Corps and the Italian II Corps facing Ras Imru in the Shire.  In the Italian center was the Eritrean Corps facing Ras Kassa and Ras Seyoum in the Tembien.  Facing Ras Mulugeta atop Amba Aradam was the Italian I Corps and the Italian III Corps.

Initially, Badoglio saw the destruction of Ras Mulugeta's army as his first priority.  Ras Mulugeta's force would have to be dislodged from its strong positions on Amba Aradam in order for the Italians to continue the advance towards Addis Ababa.  But Ras Kassa and Ras Seyoum were exerting such pressure from the Tembien that Badoglio decided that he would have to deal with them first.  If the Ethiopian center was successful, the I Corps and III Corps facing Ras Mulugeta would be cut off from reinforcement and resupply.

From 20 January to 24 January, the First Battle of Tembien was fought.  The outcome of this battle was inconclusive, but the threat Ras Kassa posed to the I Corps and III Corps was neutralized.

From 10 February to 19 February, the Battle of Amba Aradam was fought.  The outcome of this battle was a decisive Italian victory and the destruction of the army of Ras Mulugeta.

From 27 February to 29 February, the Second Battle of Tembien was fought.  The outcome of this battle was a decisive Italian victory and the destruction of the armies of Ras Kassa and Ras Seyoum.

Battle

Ras Imru had little knowledge of the battles taking place to his west.  Messages routed through Gondar took an average of eleven days to reach him.  On 29 February, Badoglio launched the Battle of Shire using the Italian II Corps and the Italian IV Corps.  But, after the defeat of Ras Kassa and Ras Seyoum, Ras Imru had already decided on his own to withdraw and avoid being trapped.

The II Corps advanced from Axum to an area thirty miles south of the town where forces of Ras Imru were known to be operating.  At the same time, the IV Corps moved south from the Eritrean border on Ras Imru's left flank.  The ground both forces traversed was very rough and very inhospitable with few roads.  At one point the II Corps was unexpectedly attacked while its units were strung out all along a single road.  They were forced to fight in old-fashioned infantry squares and the Ethiopians were only driven off when the full weight of the heavy artillery and the Royal Italian Air Force (Regia Aeronautica Italia) were brought to bear.  The Italians then set up defensive positions much to the annoyance of Badoglio.

On 2 March, the advance of the II Corps began again but was stopped the same day when it ran into Ras Imru's rear-guard.  By the time the artillery and air force were ready the next morning, the Ethiopians were gone.  Neither the II Corps nor the IV Corps managed to close the trap on Ras Imru and, for all intents and purposes, the Battle of Shire was formally over as his army retreated to join up with Haile Selassie.

Ras Imru's army withdrew from the battlefield relatively intact.  A comparison of the damages it had suffered to the damages it had done was far better than was typical on the northern front.  The Ethiopians in the Shire had suffered approximately four casualties for every Italian casualty.  While costly, this was far better than the ten Ethiopian casualties per one Italian casualty which had become expected elsewhere on the northern front.

Trapped at the Takezé

When the Royal Army (Regio Esercito) did not succeed in engaging and destroying Ras Imru's army, Badoglio turned the job over to the Regia Aeronautica.  By this point, this was common practice.  On 3 March and 4 March, Italian aircraft dropped 80 tons of high explosive and incendiary bombs on Ras Imru's army as it crossed the Tekezé River.  Beyond the river, the Ethiopians faced a rain of deadly mustard gas and strafing by low flying fighters.  When the II Corps crossed the Takezé days later, the effectiveness of the Italian air arm was made apparent by the thousands of putrefying corpses.

Aftermath
The destruction of the army of Ras Imru, following the destruction of the armies of Ras Mulugeta and Ras Kassa, allowed Bodoglio to again focus his attention on his advance on Addis Ababa.  The whole of the northern region was open and virtually unprotected.  With the exception of the army under the personal command of Haile Selassie, there was nothing between Badoglio and the Ethiopian capital.  Of Haile Selassie's options, Badoglio explained: "The Emperor has three choices. To attack, and be defeated; to wait for our attack, and we will win anyway; or to retreat, which is disastrous for an army that lacks means of transport and proper organization for food and munitions."

Badoglio meticulously prepared for his next advance.  A network of new roads was constructed.  Supplies were dumped into the forward area.  Two lines of forts were constructed and manned to protect the main lines of communication.  Bands of Azebu Oromo were armed, paid, and organized to patrol the conquered areas.  This allowed Badoglio's main force to redeploy to the front in readiness for the coming offensive.

Ras Imru escaped the destructive attacks by the Regia Aeronautica with approximately 10,000 men only to have most of them slip away when the opportunity presented itself.  By the time Imru reached Debre Marqos, he was accompanied only by the 300 men of his personal bodyguard.  His progress to re-join the Emperor was slowed by constant harassment by the Italians.  The Battle of Maychew was over before he again saw Haile Selassie.

Independent motorized columns
In addition to preparing for his next advance, Badoglio sent out a number of independent motorized columns to occupy Gondar, Deborah, Sokota, and Sardo.  These operations were carried out systematically and, as there was little opposition, they were quickly concluded.

Occupation of Gondar
On 1 April, a column led by Fascist Achille Starace captured Gondar, the capital of Begemder Province.  This mobile infantry column was between 3,000 and 5,000 strong and composed of Blackshirts.  It moved in an assortment of several hundred trucks and was called Starace's East African Fast Column (Colonna Celere dell'Africa Orientale).  Starace, known as "the Panther Man" (L'uomo pantera), was a Major General in the National Security Volunteer Militia (Milizia Volontaria per la Sicurezza Nazionale, or MSVN) and Party Secretary of the National Fascist Party (Partito Nazionale Fascista, or PNF).  By 3 April, Starace and his men reached the shores of Lake Tana.  The border region with British Sudan was secured and the Panther Man's column had covered approximately 75 miles in three days.  There were rumors that Ras Imru had 40,000 men at Ifag and Ras Kassa had 8,000 men at Debre Tabor.  With British help, these forces were organizing to retake Gondar.

Occupation of Debre Tabor
On 24 April, two battalions from Starace's column, the "Mussolini" Blackshirt Battalion and the 111th Native Battalion, made a surprise attack on Debre Tabor.  The battalions met with no resistance.  While Ras Kassa and Dejazmach Ayalew Birru had been reported to be in Debre Tabor, Ras Kassa was in actuality many miles away and Dejazmach Ayalew Birru had left as the Italians approached.

See also 
 Ethiopian Order of Battle Second Italo-Abyssinian War
 Army of the Ethiopian Empire
List of Second Italo-Ethiopian War weapons of Ethiopia
 Italian Order of Battle Second Italo-Abyssinian War
 Royal Italian Army
List of Italian military equipment in the Second Italo-Ethiopian War

Notes 
Footnotes

Citations

References 
 
 
 

1936 in Ethiopia
Conflicts in 1936
Battles of the Second Italo-Ethiopian War
Battles involving Ethiopia
Battles involving Italy
February 1936 events
March 1936 events